The Plex is a 2008 Australian film directed by Tim Boyle and starring Matt Doran, Jason Crewes and Samantha Turner. The film premiered on 4 September 2008.

Synopsis 
AJ lives an unsatisfactory life as an usher at the local Multiplex cinema working alongside his best friend Zeke and his sexy, but power hungry girlfriend Katie. After AJ is unfairly fired he decides to get even with his old boss.

Cast
 Laura Andersen as Betty Parker
 Steve Bastoni as The Baron / Mad Morgan Edwards
 John Boxer as Angus Vasnar
 Gerard Boyle as Single Guy
 Tim Boyle as A.D.D. Dave
 Andrew Caryofyllis as Allan Smithee
 Peter Chapman as Change Guy
 Brian Cobb as Hollywood Sam
 Michael Cotton-Stapleton as Sebastian
 Jason Crewes as Zeke Edwards
 Leo Domigan as Frank Stone
 Matt Doran as AJ Stone
 Gabriel Egan as Blinger
 Adam Gelin as Donations Man
 Salme Geransar as Misty
 Simon T. Gleeson as Stefan
 Shaun Angus Hall as Sci Fi Movie Freak
 Tori Hartigan as Bec
 Stella Ha Vi Do as Japanese Woman
 Damion Hunter as Mac
 Mark Jensen as Mr. Carbonie
 John Schwarz as Vincent Vasnar
 Tai Scrivener as Keith
 Yvonne Strahovski as Sarah
 Samantha Turner as Kat
 Alys Daroy as Voice of Sarah (Yvonne Strahovski)

References

External links
 

2008 films
Australian comedy films
2000s English-language films
2000s Australian films